George Montagu-Dunk, 2nd Earl of Halifax,  (6 October 1716 – 8 June 1771) was a British statesman of the Georgian era. Due to his success in extending commerce in the Americas, he became known as the "father of the colonies". President of the Board of Trade from 1748 to 1761, he aided the foundation of Nova Scotia, 1749, the capital Halifax being named after him. When Canada was ceded to the King of Great Britain by the King of France, following the Treaty of Paris of 1763, he restricted its boundaries and renamed it "Province of Quebec".

Early life
The son of the 1st Earl of Halifax, he was styled Viscount Sunbury until succeeding his father as Earl of Halifax in 1739 (thus also styled in common usage Lord Halifax). Educated at Eton College and at Trinity College, Cambridge, he was married in 1741 to Anne Richards (died 1753), who had inherited a great fortune from Sir Thomas Dunk, whose name Halifax took.

Career

After having been an official in the household of Frederick, Prince of Wales, Halifax was made Master of the Buckhounds, and in 1748 he became President of the Board of Trade. While filling this position he helped to found Halifax, the capital of Nova Scotia, which was named after him, and he helped foster trade, especially with North America.

About this time he attempted, unsuccessfully, to become a Secretary of State, but was only allowed to enter the Cabinet in 1757. In March 1761, Halifax was appointed Lord Lieutenant of Ireland, and during part of the time which he held this office he was also First Lord of the Admiralty.

He became Secretary of State for the Northern Department under Lord Bute in October 1762, switching to the Southern Department in 1763 and was one of the three ministers to whom King George III entrusted the direction of affairs during the premiership of George Grenville. In 1762, in search of evidence of sedition, he authorised a raid on the home of John Entick, declared unlawful in the case of Entick v. Carrington.

In 1763, he signed the general warrant for the "authors, printers and publishers" of The North Briton number 45, under which John Wilkes and 48 others were arrested, and for which, six years later, the courts of law made Halifax pay damages. 
He was also mainly responsible for the exclusion of the name of the King's mother, Augusta, Princess of Wales, from the Regency Bill of 1765.

Together with his colleagues, Halifax left office in July 1765, returning to the Cabinet as Lord Privy Seal under his nephew, Lord North, in January 1770. He had just been restored to his former position of Secretary of State when he died.

Cricket
Like his friends John Russell, 4th Duke of Bedford, and John Montagu, 4th Earl of Sandwich, Halifax was keen on cricket. The earliest surviving record of his involvement in the sport comes from 1741 when he led Northamptonshire in a match against Buckinghamshire at Cow Meadow in Northampton. In the same season, Sandwich and Halifax formed the Northamptonshire & Huntingdonshire team which twice defeated Bedfordshire, first at Woburn Park and then at Cow Meadow.

Legacy

Social, moral and cultural impact
Halifax, who was Lord-Lieutenant of Northamptonshire and a Lieutenant General, was very extravagant. During the House of Commons election for Northampton in 1768, he spent £150,000 bribing voters to support his candidate, George Brydges Rodney, and was financially ruined by the effort.

He was a political patron of playwright and civil servant Richard Cumberland.  He left no legitimate male children, and his titles became extinct on his death. Horace Walpole, 4th Earl of Orford, spoke slightingly of him and his mistress, Anna Maria Faulkner, including alleging that Halifax had "sold every employment in his gift". His mistress had kept a low profile while he was in Ireland, but she was understood to have sold positions.

Politics
Halifax was opposed to slavery, and refused to invest his money in any cause that was linked to the TransAtlantic slave trade. There were numerous occasions in which colonists in North America came into conflict with Parliament, and on every one of those occasions he publicly voiced support for the colonists, thus leading to him becoming a popular figure in Britain's North American colonies, including the Province of Massachusetts Bay, the Province of North Carolina and the Colony of Virginia. Halifax supported expanding the franchise so that a larger portion of people in the Kingdom of Great Britain would be able to vote in parliamentary elections. His mistress had kept a low profile while he was in Ireland, but she was alleged to have sold positions which was a political scandal for part of Halifax's career.

Memorials
Halifax was buried in the parish church of Horton, Northamptonshire; an effigy bust and plaque features in the north transept of Westminster Abbey. An obelisk is erected at Chicksands Wood in the parish of Haynes, Bedfordshire, inscribed to his memory.

Related locations
The municipality of Halifax and Halifax County, Nova Scotia, are named in his honour, as are the Halifax River in Central Florida; the town of Halifax and Halifax County, North Carolina; Halifax, Virginia, in the United States; and Dunk Island in Queensland and Montague Island in New South Wales.

Footnotes

Attribution:

Bibliography

Further reading
 Andrew D. M. Beaumont, Colonial America and the Earl of Halifax, 1748-1761. Oxford, England: Oxford University Press, 2015.

External links
 

 

1716 births
1771 deaths
18th-century British politicians
18th-century English nobility
British Secretaries of State
Earls of Halifax
Knights of the Garter
Lord-Lieutenants of Northamptonshire
Lords of the Admiralty
Lords Privy Seal
Members of the Privy Council of Great Britain
George Montagu-Dunk, 2nd Earl of Halifax
Pre-Confederation Nova Scotia people
Masters of the Buckhounds
English cricketers
English cricketers of 1701 to 1786
Northamptonshire cricketers
Cricket patrons
Lords Lieutenant of Ireland
Presidents of the Board of Trade
Alumni of Trinity College, Cambridge
Tory (British political party) politicians
18th-century philanthropists
Leaders of the House of Lords
People educated at Eton College